A gamekeeper (often abbreviated to keeper), or in case of those dealing with deer (deer-)stalker, is a person who manages an area of countryside (e.g. areas of woodland, moorland, waterway or farmland) to make sure there is enough game for shooting and stalking, or fish for angling, and acts as guide to those pursuing them.

Description 

Typically, a gamekeeper is employed by a landowner or by a country estate, to prevent poaching, to rear and release game birds such as common pheasants and French partridge, eradicate pests, encourage and manage wild red grouse, and to control predators such as weasels, to manage habitats to suit game, and to monitor the health of the game. Today, some three thousand full-time gamekeepers are employed in the UK, compared to as many as 25,000 at the beginning of the 20th century. In addition, there are many people who spend their leisure time and money rearing game and maintaining habitats on their own small shoots.

There are several variations in gamekeeping:

 Stalkers: keepers who specialise in the stealthy pursuit of deer, mainly in the uplands of Scotland.
 Lowland keepers: rearing pheasant and partridge and managing lowland habitats.

 Upland keepers: managing moorland for grouse in upland areas.
 Gillie/river keepers: keepers who manage rivers such as the River Spey for trout and salmon.

The most senior individual dealing with wildlife on a particular estate is often called the headkeeper or headstalker. However the spellings head keeper and head stalker are much more common.

Gamekeepers and country sports enthusiasts hold that gamekeeping is an essential part of countryside conservation. Two thirds of the UK rural landmass is managed for shooting. The shooting industry creates £1.6 billion. £250 million is spent on conservation as a result of shooting.

Training
Some colleges in the UK now offer courses in gamekeeping up to and including diploma level. Two of these include the Northern School of Game and Wildlife at Newton Rigg, Cumbria and Myerscough College, Lancashire.

The Elmwood Campus of SRUC (Scotland's Rural College) in Cupar, Fife is Scotland's main gamekeeping college. The main campus for attaining both NC and HNC levels in gamekeepeing for south Scotland is borders college. Easton and Otley college: Easton Campus also provides a course on gamekeeping level 2 and 3.

Scottish Gamekeepers Association
In 1997, as a result of months of adverse media criticism of gamekeepers, the Scottish Gamekeepers Association (SGA) was formed with a goal of promoting the work of gamekeepers and developing training in the area of law and best practices in the field of game management. The SGA chairman is Alex Hogg, a gamekeeper from Scotland.

The National Gamekeepers' Organisation 

In 1997, the National Gamekeepers' Organisation (NGO) was set up for the same reasons and in addition they felt that the main shooting association was not representing the keepers properly. The NGO now has some 15,000 members. The NGO run industry-based training for keepers and were the first organisation to react to EU legislation with regards to game meat hygiene producing a course for experienced keepers and stalkers which had approval from the Food Standards Agency. The NGO continue to promote gamekeeping, stalking, shooting and fishing. Its chairman is Lindsay Waddell, a gamekeeper from Co. Durham. The NGO also have dedicated moorland and deer branches.

Criticism 
The League Against Cruel Sports estimates some 12,300 wild mammals and birds are killed on UK shooting estates every day and sees gamekeepers as playing a key role in the destruction of wildlife. On the other hand, the shooting industry says that gamekeepers are vital wildlife conservation workers in the countryside. The National Gamekeeper's Organisation (NGO) claims that nine times as much of the British countryside is looked after by gamekeepers as is in nature reserves and National Parks.

The Royal Society for the Protection of Birds has criticised the persecution of birds of prey on some shooting estates. 68% of those convicted of raptor persecution are gamekeepers. "We’ve seen evidence linking gamekeepers to bird of prey persecution, and moorlands empty of raptors imply that much more illegal killing goes on undetected".

In fiction

 Alec Scudder in Maurice by E. M. Forster
 Mellors in Lady Chatterley's Lover by D. H. Lawrence
Rubeus Hagrid in the Harry Potter series
 Tom Redruth in Treasure Island by Robert Louis Stevenson
 Phillip White in Lark Rise to Candleford
 Several characters past and present in the BBC Radio 4 soap opera The Archers e.g. Andrew Gach
 Joseph in Hautot and His Son by Guy de Maupassant
 William Crowder in The Boscombe Valley Mystery by Sir Arthur Conan Doyle
The Gamekeeper by Barry Hines
 Kincade in Skyfall
 Golly Mackenzie in Monarch of the Glen
 The Gamekeeper at Home by Richard Jefferies - 1878
 Robert Muldoon in Jurassic Park
 Jocelyn Greedon in Doctors
 Nield in Downton Abbey

See also

Professional hunter
Hunting
Game preservation
Gamekeeper's thumb

Further reading 

Norman Maclean: A Less Green and Pleasant Land: Our Threatened Wildlife. Cambridge University Press, 2015, .

External links 

Gamekeeping as a career - BASC
National Gamekeeper's Organisation

References

Animal care occupations
Animal husbandry occupations
Hunting and shooting in the United Kingdom
Sports occupations and roles